The Greenwich Cup was a greyhound racing competition held annually from 1946 until 2003.

It was inaugurated in 1946 at New Cross Stadium but following the closure of New Cross in 1969 it switched to Charlton Stadium. It only survived two years at Charlton because it also closed and the race found its final home at Catford Stadium in 1972. When the Greyhound Racing Association shut down Catford in 2003 the race was discontinued.

Past winners

Venues & Distances 
1946-1964 (New Cross 415 yards)
1965-1968 (New Cross 600 yards)
1969-1970 (Charlton 600 yards) 
1972-2003 (Catford 555 metres)

Sponsors
1987-2000 E.Coomes Bookmakers
2001-2001 Brake Bros
2002-2003 William Hill

References

Greyhound racing competitions in the United Kingdom
Sport in the London Borough of Lewisham
Recurring sporting events established in 1946
Greyhound racing in London